Louis Power (10 October 1905 – 30 September 1988) was an Australian cricketer. He played in two first-class matches for South Australia in 1926/27.

See also
 List of South Australian representative cricketers

References

External links
 

1905 births
1988 deaths
Australian cricketers
South Australia cricketers
Cricketers from Adelaide